A User's Guide to They Might Be Giants is a 2005 compilation album by the group They Might Be Giants.

In the April 29, 2005 "TMBG News" online newsletter, bandmember John Flansburgh describes the album as such:
"Rhino is releasing the single disc compilation A User's Guide To They Might Be Giants – kind of a simple reduction of Dial-A-Song – on May 3. It is a very interesting introduction to the band. If you were looking for a single disc to lay on the uninitiated, this might be the one. The liner notes, put together with our pal Barbara Glauber, are quite extensive. We've tried to compile all the songs and all the shows since the band's inception. Obviously this was a bit of a research nightmare (I'm not even sure if the show list includes in-stores!) but it is a very interesting object to look at, especially if you have good near-field vision."

Although Flansburgh referred to the album as a condensed version of Dial-A-Song: 20 Years Of They Might Be Giants, it includes two songs not on Dial-A-Song: "John Lee Supertaster" and "Clap Your Hands." Additionally, the album contains the original versions of both "Why Does the Sun Shine?" and "Don't Let's Start", as opposed to the live and single versions, respectively, found on Dial-A-Song.

Song origins
 Tracks 1, 3, 7, 10 and 18 originally from Flood (1990)
 Track 2 originally from John Henry (1994)
 Tracks 4, 5 and 22 originally from They Might Be Giants (1986)
 Tracks 6 and 13 originally from Mink Car (2001)
 Tracks 8, 11 and 20 originally from Lincoln (1988)
 Tracks 9 and 15 originally from Factory Showroom (1996)
 Tracks 12, 14, 21 and 29 originally from Apollo 18 (1992)
 Track 16 originally from Severe Tire Damage (1998)
 Track 17 originally from Boss of Me EP (2000) and is the theme song for Malcolm in the Middle, although a shorter version is usually used
 Track 19 originally from Why Does The Sun Shine? (The Sun Is a Mass of Incandescent Gas) EP (1993)
 Tracks 23, 27 and 28 originally from No! (2002)
 Track 24 originally from Long Tall Weekend (1999)
 Track 25 originally from Don't Let's Start EP (1987), and later Miscellaneous T (1991)
 Track 26 originally from  More Music from the Motion Picture Austin Powers: The Spy Who Shagged Me (1999)

Track listing
All songs by They Might Be Giants unless otherwise noted

 "Minimum Wage" – 0:47
 "Meet James Ensor" – 1:33
 "Particle Man" – 1:59
 "Don't Let's Start" – 2:34
 "She's an Angel" – 2:37
 "Cyclops Rock" – 2:38
 "Istanbul (Not Constantinople)" (Jimmy Kennedy, Nat Simon) – 2:38
 "Purple Toupee" – 2:40
 "James K. Polk" (Matthew Hill, They Might Be Giants) – 3:04
 "Birdhouse in Your Soul" – 3:20
 "Ana Ng" – 3:23
 "The Guitar (The Lion Sleeps Tonight)" (They Might Be Giants, Hugo Peretti, Luigi Creatore, George David Weiss) – 3:49
 "Bangs" – 3:09
 "The Statue Got Me High" – 3:06
 "New York City" (Robynn Iwata, Lisa Nielsen, and Lisa Marr) – 3:02
 "Doctor Worm" – 3:01
 "Boss of Me" – 2:58
 "Your Racist Friend" – 2:54
 "Why Does the Sun Shine? (The Sun Is a Mass of Incandescent Gas)" (Louis Singer, Hy Zaret) – 2:53
 "They'll Need a Crane" – 2:33
 "I Palindrome I" – 2:22
 "Put Your Hand Inside the Puppet Head" – 2:12
 "John Lee Supertaster" – 2:01
 "Older" – 1:58
 "We're the Replacements" – 1:50
 "Dr. Evil" – 1:48
 "No!" – 1:29
 "Clap Your Hands" – 1:22
 "Spider" – 0:51

References

External links
A User's Guide to They Might Be Giants on This Might Be a Wiki

Rhino Records compilation albums
They Might Be Giants compilation albums
2005 compilation albums